Pennsylvania Station, also known as New York Penn Station or simply Penn Station, is the main intercity railroad station in New York City and the busiest transportation facility in the Western Hemisphere, serving more than 600,000 passengers per weekday . It is located in Midtown Manhattan, beneath Madison Square Garden in the block bounded by Seventh and Eighth Avenues and 31st and 33rd Streets, and in the James A. Farley Building, with additional exits to nearby streets. It is close to Herald Square, the Empire State Building, Koreatown, and Macy's Herald Square.

Penn Station has 21 tracks fed by seven tunnels (the two North River Tunnels, the four East River Tunnels, and the single Empire Connection tunnel). It is at the center of the Northeast Corridor, a passenger rail line that connects New York City to Boston, Philadelphia, Washington, D.C., and intermediate points. Intercity trains are operated by Amtrak, which owns the station, while commuter rail services are operated by the Long Island Rail Road (LIRR) and NJ Transit (NJT). Connections are available within the complex to the New York City Subway and buses.

Penn Station is named for the Pennsylvania Railroad (PRR), its builder and original owner, and shares its name with several stations in other cities. The current facility is the remodeled underground remnant of the original Pennsylvania Station, a more ornate station building designed by McKim, Mead, and White and considered a masterpiece of the Beaux-Arts style. Completed in 1910, it enabled direct rail access to New York City from the south for the first time. Its head house was torn down in 1963, galvanizing the modern historic preservation movement. The rest of the station was rebuilt in the following six years, while retaining most of the rail infrastructure from the original station.

A new direct entrance from 33rd Street to the LIRR concourse opened in December 2020. Moynihan Train Hall, an expansion of Penn Station into a mixed-use redevelopment of the adjacent Farley Post Office building, opened one day later in January 2021.

Plans call for further expanding the LIRR concourse, adding railway platforms in a new southern annex to accommodate two proposed Gateway Program tunnels under the Hudson River, adding underground connections to the Herald Square station and with the PATH to the 33rd Street station, and renovating the core Penn Station under Madison Square Garden.

History

Planning and construction

Until the early 20th century, the PRR's rail network terminated on the western side of the Hudson River (once known locally as the North River) at Exchange Place in Jersey City, New Jersey. Manhattan-bound passengers boarded ferries to cross the Hudson River for the final stretch of their journey.

The rival New York Central Railroad's line ran down Manhattan from the north under Park Avenue and terminated at Grand Central Depot (later replaced by Grand Central Terminal) at 42nd Street. Many proposals for a cross-Hudson connection were advanced in the late 19th century, but financial panics in the 1870s and 1890s scared off potential investors. In any event, none of the proposals advanced during this time were considered feasible.

An early proposal for a bridge was considered but rejected. The alternative was to tunnel under the river, but this was infeasible for steam locomotive use. The development of the electric locomotive at the turn of the 20th century made a tunnel feasible. In 1901, PRR president Alexander Cassatt announced the railroad's plan to enter New York City by tunneling under the Hudson and building a grand station on the West Side of Manhattan south of 34th Street. The station would sit in Manhattan's Tenderloin district, a historical red-light district known for its corruption and prostitution.

Beginning in June 1903, the two single-track North River Tunnels were bored from the west under the Hudson River. A second set of four single-track tunnels, the East River Tunnels, were bored from the east under the East River, linking the new station to Queens, the PRR-owned Long Island Rail Road, and Sunnyside Yard in Queens, where trains would be maintained and assembled. Construction was completed on the Hudson River tunnels on October 9, 1906, and on the East River tunnels on March 18, 1908.

Original structure

A small portion of Penn Station opened on September 8, 1910, in conjunction with the opening of the East River Tunnels, and LIRR riders gained direct railroad service to Manhattan. On November 27, 1910, Penn Station was fully opened to the public. With the station's full opening, the PRR became the only railroad to enter New York City from the south.

During half a century of operation by the Pennsylvania Railroad (1910–1963), scores of intercity passenger trains arrived and departed daily to Chicago and St. Louis on "Pennsy" rails and beyond on connecting railroads to Miami and the west. Along with Long Island Rail Road trains, Penn Station saw trains of the New Haven and the Lehigh Valley railroads. A side effect of the tunneling project was to open the city up to the suburbs, and within 10 years of opening, two-thirds of the daily passengers coming through Penn Station were commuters.

The station put the Pennsylvania Railroad at comparative advantage to its competitors offering direct service from Manhattan to the west and south. Other railroads began their routes at terminals in Weehawken, Hoboken, Pavonia and Communipaw which required passengers from New York City to take the interstate Hudson Tubes (now PATH) or ferries across the Hudson River before boarding their trains. By 1945, at its peak, more than 100 million passengers a year traveled through Penn Station.

By the late 1950s, intercity rail passenger volumes had declined dramatically with the coming of the Jet Age and the Interstate Highway System. The station's exterior had become somewhat grimy, and due to its vast scale, the station was expensive to maintain. A renovation covered some of the grand columns with plastic and blocked off the spacious central hallway with a new ticket office. The Pennsylvania Railroad optioned the air rights, which called for the demolition of the head house and train shed, to be replaced by an office complex and a new sports complex, while the tracks of the station would remain untouched.

Plans for the new Penn Plaza and Madison Square Garden were announced in 1962. In exchange for the air rights to Penn Station, the PRR would receive a smaller underground station at no cost and a 25 percent stake in the new Madison Square Garden Complex. Modern architects rushed to save the ornate building, but to no avail; demolition of the above-ground head house began in October 1963.

A giant steel deck was placed over the tracks and platforms to allow rail service to continue during construction. Photographs of the day showed passengers waiting for trains even as the head house was demolished around them. This was possible because most of the rail infrastructure (including the waiting room, concourses, and boarding platforms) was below street level.

The demolition of the Penn Station head house was controversial and caused outrage internationally. "One entered the city like a god. One scuttles in now like a rat," the architectural historian Vincent Scully famously wrote of the original station. The controversy over the demolition of such a well-known landmark, and its deplored replacement, is often cited as a catalyst for the architectural preservation movement in the United States. New laws were passed to restrict such demolition. Within the decade, Grand Central Terminal was protected under the city's new landmarks preservation act, a protection upheld by the courts in 1978 after a challenge by Grand Central's owner, Penn Central.

Under Madison Square Garden

Post-1968, the core Penn Station has been underground, sitting below Madison Square Garden, 33rd Street, and Two Penn Plaza. The core has three levels: concourses on the upper two levels and train platforms on the lowest. The two levels of concourses, while renovated and expanded during the construction of Madison Square Garden, are original to the 1910 station, as are the tracks and platforms.

Over the following decades, various renovations attempted to add service and some concourse space. The West End Concourse under Eighth Avenue opened in 1986. In 1987, a rail connection to the West Side Rail Yard opened, and in 1991, the opening of the Empire Connection allowed Amtrak to consolidate all of its New York City trains at Penn Station. Previously, all trains running along the Empire Corridor terminated at nearby Grand Central Terminal. This was a legacy of the two stations' roots in separate railroads–the PRR and New York Central, respectively. The consolidation saved Amtrak the expense of having to maintain two stations in New York City, including having to pay the MTA $600,000 in fees a year.

In 1994, the station was renovated to add the 34th Street LIRR entrance and central corridor, along with artwork and improved waiting and concession areas. The new entrance consisted of a  structure with a glass and brick facade, a clock salvaged from the original station, and air-conditioning units for the terminal. In 2002, the NJ Transit concourse was created in space previously occupied by retail and Amtrak office space, although the concourse could only be accessed from the Amtrak entrance on 32nd Street. Plans for a new entrance from 31st Street to the NJ Transit concourse were announced in 2006, and the entrance opened in 2009.

After the September 11 attacks, security was increased and passenger flow curtailed. In 2002, $100 million of work added security features such as lighting, cameras, and barricades. The taxiway under Madison Square Garden, which ran from 31st Street to 33rd Street at mid-block, was permanently closed off with concrete Jersey barriers. Escalators providing direct access to the lobby of Madison Square Garden were closed and later removed. The underground Gimbels Passageway connecting pedestrians to 34th Street–Herald Square has been sealed off since 1986, after decades of safety concerns and sexual assaults.

Despite the modest renovations, the underground Penn Station continued to be criticized as "reviled," "dysfunctional," and a low-ceilinged "catacomb" lacking charm, especially when compared to the much larger and more ornate Grand Central Terminal. The New York Times, in a November 2007 editorial supporting development of an enlarged terminal, said that "Amtrak's beleaguered customers...scurry through underground rooms bereft of light or character," and Times transit reporter Michael M. Grynbaum called Penn Station "the ugly stepchild of the city’s two great rail terminals." After its nadir in the 1960s, ridership exploded in subsequent decades, a situation never contemplated by the structure's designers. By the 2010s, the station operated at almost three times its intended capacity; over 600,000 passengers used the station daily in 2019.

Expansion 

In the early 1990s, U.S. Senator Daniel Patrick Moynihan proposed building a new station in the James A. Farley Building, the city's former main post office across the street. Moynihan had shined shoes in the original station as a boy. Many redevelopment or expansion concepts were unveiled over the 1990s and 2000s, but none reached fruition until funding from the 2009 American Recovery and Reinvestment Act enabled the expansion of the West End Concourse of the LIRR under the Farley Building in 2016. Building on it, New York Governor Andrew Cuomo in 2016 announced plans for renovation of Penn Station and mixed-use redevelopment of the Farley Building, including development of a new train hall, which he called the Empire Station Complex. The new expansion, Moynihan Train Hall, opened in January 2021, named for the man who had conceived it. The $1.6 billion,  renovation retained the original, landmarked Beaux Arts Farley Building, added a central atrium with a glass roof, and provided access to Amtrak and LIRR trains. A new 33rd Street entrance to the LIRR concourse opened at the same time.

The station received a place in the world selection for the 2021 Prix Versailles in the passenger stations category.

Services

The station is served by 1,300 arrivals and departures per day, twice the number during the 1970s. There are more than 600,000 subway, commuter rail and Amtrak passengers who use the station on an average weekday, or up to 1,000 every ninety seconds. It is the busiest passenger transportation facility in the United States and in North America.

Intercity rail

Amtrak 

Amtrak owns the station and uses it for the following services:

 Acela to Boston (northern terminus) and Washington D.C. (southern terminus)
 Adirondack to Montreal
 Berkshire Flyer to Pittsfield
 Cardinal to Chicago
 Carolinian to Charlotte
 Crescent to New Orleans
 Empire Service to Albany and Niagara Falls, NY
 Ethan Allen Express to Burlington
 Keystone Service to Harrisburg
 Lake Shore Limited to Chicago
 Maple Leaf to Toronto
 Pennsylvanian to Pittsburgh
 Northeast Regional to Boston or Springfield (northern termini) and Roanoke, Newport News, Richmond, or Norfolk (southern termini)
 Palmetto to Savannah
 Silver Meteor to Miami
 Silver Star to Miami
 Vermonter to Washington D.C. (southern terminus) and St. Albans (northern terminus)

All except the Acela Express, Northeast Regional and Vermonter originate and terminate at Penn Station.

Despite its status as Amtrak's busiest station, Amtrak's Superliner railcars cannot use Penn Station due to incompatible platform heights and inadequate clearances in the North River and East River Tunnels.

Amtrak normally uses tracks 5–12 alongside New Jersey Transit and shares tracks 13–16 with the LIRR and NJ Transit.

Commuter rail

Long Island Rail Road
The following Long Island Rail Road (LIRR) services originate and terminate at Penn Station:

 Babylon Branch to Babylon
 Belmont Park Branch seasonal service to Belmont Park
 Far Rockaway Branch to Far Rockaway, Queens in New York City
 Hempstead Branch to Hempstead
 Long Beach Branch to Long Beach
 Montauk Branch to Babylon and Montauk
 Oyster Bay Branch to Oyster Bay
 Port Jefferson Branch to Huntington and Port Jefferson
 Port Washington Branch to Port Washington
 Ronkonkoma Branch to Ronkonkoma with connecting service to Greenport
 West Hempstead Branch to Hempstead

All branches connect at Jamaica station except the Port Washington Branch. Jamaica station also connects to Airtrain JFK for service to John F. Kennedy International Airport.

Normally, the LIRR uses tracks 17 to 21 exclusively and shares tracks 13 to 16 with Amtrak and NJT. The LIRR uses tracks 11 and 12 on rare occasions.

NJ Transit

The following NJ Transit Rail Operations (NJT) branches originate and terminate at Penn Station:
 Montclair-Boonton Line to Montclair State University station, with connecting service west to Hackettstown.
 Morris and Essex Lines, consisting of the Morristown Line to Dover via Morristown and the Gladstone Branch to Gladstone. 
 Northeast Corridor Line to Trenton
 North Jersey Coast Line to Long Branch and Bay Head
 Raritan Valley Line to Raritan and High Bridge

NJT normally uses tracks 1 to 4 exclusively, as these four tracks end at bumper blocks to their east. NJT shares tracks 5 through 12 with Amtrak, and occasionally uses tracks 13 to 16, which are shared with Amtrak and the LIRR.

Rapid transit

New York City Subway
Connections are available to the following New York City Subway stations:
 From Penn Station:
  at 34th Street–Penn Station, under Eighth Avenue
  at 34th Street–Penn Station, under Seventh Avenue
 From Herald Square, one block east at Sixth Avenue:
  at 34th Street–Herald Square station, under Broadway & Sixth Avenue

PATH
Connections are also available to the PATH system at 33rd Street station, under Sixth Avenue on Herald Square. The JSQ-33 and HOB-33 services terminate at 33rd Street on weekdays, and are combined into the JSQ-33 (via HOB) service on late nights, weekends and holidays.

Bus and coach
NYC Airporter provides bus transportation to and from John F. Kennedy International Airport and LaGuardia Airport, and is authorized by the Port Authority of New York and New Jersey and the New York City Department of Transportation.

New York City Bus
The following MTA Regional Bus Operations buses stop near Penn Station:
 M7 (Lenox, Columbus, Amsterdam, Sixth and Seventh Avenues): southbound to Greenwich Village, via Seventh Avenue; or northbound to Harlem via Sixth, Amsterdam, and Lenox Avenues
 M20 (Seventh and Eighth Avenues/Varick and Hudson Streets): northbound to Lincoln Center via Eighth Avenue; or southbound to South Ferry via Seventh Avenue
 M34 Select Bus Service (34th Street Crosstown): westbound to Javits Center; or eastbound to FDR Drive
 M34A Select Bus Service (34th Street Crosstown): westbound to Port Authority Bus Terminal; or eastbound to Waterside Plaza and Kips Bay
 Q32 (Fifth and Madison Avenues): northbound only, to Jackson Heights, Queens

Intercity coaches
Intercity bus service to and from Penn Station is provided by Vamoose Bus, Tripper Bus, and Go Buses. Vamoose Bus runs buses from a stop near Penn Station to Bethesda, Maryland; Arlington, Virginia; and Lorton, Virginia. Tripper Bus runs buses from a stop near Penn Station to Bethesda, Maryland and Arlington, Virginia. Go Buses runs buses from a stop near Penn Station to Newton, Massachusetts and Cambridge, Massachusetts.

Most intercity and commuter bus services to and from midtown Manhattan use the Port Authority Bus Terminal, located approximately 0.5 miles (0.8 kilometers) to the north of Penn Station.

Airline ticketing
Penn Station includes a United Airlines ticketing office, located at the ticket lobby. This was previously a Continental Airlines ticketing office.

Proposed Metro-North service

The Metropolitan Transportation Authority plans to bring Metro-North Railroad commuter trains to Penn Station as part of its Penn Station Access project. The East Side Access project, which opened in 2023, will free up track and platform space at Penn Station by redirecting some LIRR trains from Penn Station to Grand Central Terminal. This new capacity, as well as track connections resulting from the East Side Access project, would allow Metro-North trains on the New Haven Line to run to Penn Station via Amtrak's Hell Gate Bridge.

Four new local Metro-North stations in the Bronx are planned as part of this project, at Co-op City, Morris Park, Parkchester/VanNest, and Hunts Point. The MTA also proposes a second connection from the Metro-North's Hudson Line to Penn Station using Amtrak's West Side Line in Manhattan. The Penn Station Access project would provide direct rides from Connecticut, Westchester County, the Lower Hudson Valley, and the Bronx to West Midtown; ease reverse-commuting from Manhattan and the Bronx to Westchester County, the Lower Hudson Valley, and Connecticut; and provide transportation service to areas of the Bronx without direct subway service.

Station layout

Penn Station does not have a unified design or floor plan but rather is divided into separate Amtrak, LIRR and NJ Transit concourses with each concourse maintained and styled differently by its respective operator. The Amtrak and NJ Transit concourses are located on the first level below the street level while the Long Island Rail Road concourse is two levels below street level.

The main concourse, which was principally used by Amtrak until the opening of the Moynihan Train Hall, is at the west end of the station directly beneath Madison Square Garden. It was created out of the original station's waiting rooms and main concourse, though few remnants of the original still exist in the space. It was renovated in the early 2000s in anticipation of Acela service and includes an enclosed waiting area for ticketed passengers with seats, outlets and WiFi.

The LIRR's connecting concourse runs below West 33rd Street between Seventh and Eighth Avenues, as it has since the original station opened in 1910. Significant renovations were made to the LIRR areas over a three-year period ending in 1994, including the opening of the Central Corridor passageway and the addition of a new entry pavilion on 34th Street. The West End Concourse, west of Eighth Avenue, opened in 1986, and was widened and lengthened to cover tracks 5 through 21 in 2017.

The NJ Transit concourse near Seventh Avenue opened in 2002 out of existing retail and Amtrak office space. A new street-level entrance to this concourse at the corner of 31st Street and Seventh Avenue opened in September 2009. Previously, NJ Transit used space in the Amtrak concourse.

The station is so complex that in December 2017, Amtrak and Zyter released a mobile app called FindYourWay to help commuters navigate around Penn Station, though Zyter also plans to roll out the app at other large Amtrak stations. 
The station's three providers use different official addresses for the station.

 Amtrak: 351 West 31st Street
 LIRR: 34th Street at 7th and 8th Avenues
 NJ Transit: 390 7th Avenue

Tracks and surrounding infrastructure

In normal operations, Amtrak and NJ Transit share tracks 5–12, while the LIRR has the exclusive use of tracks 17–21 on the north side of the station. All three railroads share tracks 13–16. Tracks 1–4 end at bumper blocks at the eastern end of the platform and have no access to the East River Tunnels and are used exclusively by NJ Transit since there's no access to Amtrak's Sunnyside Yard in Queens, NY.

From the east, the East River Tunnels' lines 1 and 2 (the more southerly tubes) can only access tracks 5–17 and are used by most Amtrak and NJ Transit trains, while the East River Tunnels' lines 3 and 4 (the more northerly tubes) can only access tracks 14–21 and are mostly used by LIRR. From the west, the North River Tunnels can access tracks 1–19, while the Empire Connection can only access tracks 1–9 and the LIRR's West Side Yard can only access tracks 10–21.

All station tracks are powered by 12 kV overhead wire. Tracks 5–21 also have 750 V DC third rail. Due to the lack of proper ventilation in the tunnels and station, only electric locomotives and dual-mode locomotives are scheduled to enter Penn Station. Diesel-only NJT trains terminate at Hoboken Terminal or Newark Penn Station, and diesel-only LIRR trains terminate at or prior to Long Island City.

Trains on track 18 open their doors only on the north side (platform 10).

2017–2018 service disruptions and track improvements
Since the early 2010s, Amtrak had planned to fix the deteriorating rails and infrastructure around Penn Station, but due to the prioritization of other projects, applied only minimal fixes. In early 2017, this culminated in numerous power outages, derailments, and delays due to track maintenance delays. There were frequent service disruptions to train schedules caused by the deterioration of its tracks and their supporting infrastructure, as well as in those of the East River and North River tunnels that respectively connect the station to Long Island and New Jersey.

A string of early 2017 service disruptions started on March 23, 2017, when an Acela train derailed, causing delays for the day. On April 3, a NJ Transit train derailed at a known problem site, where repairs had been deferred. This caused four days of reduced service along the Northeast Corridor for both Amtrak and NJ Transit, because the incident damaged the switch that connects Tracks 1–8 to the North River tunnels. This closure caused a cascading failure, delaying Amtrak and Long Island Rail Road trains on the unaffected tracks.

On April 14, a New Jersey Transit train became stuck in the North River tunnels, causing the station to grow crowded with waiting passengers. After an Amtrak police officer used a Taser on a man who was acting disruptively, rumors of gunshots sparked a stampede that injured 16 people. Following the stampede, U.S. Senator Chuck Schumer called on Amtrak to centralize law enforcement response.

As a result of these incidents, the Long Island Rail Road had proposed taking over Penn Station from Amtrak to improve maintenance, and New Jersey has suggested withholding state payments to Amtrak. Amtrak has discussed accelerating major maintenance work, even at the cost of further disruptions, to more quickly stabilize infrastructure and decrease more future incidents that could potentially cause even greater disruption.

On April 28, 2017, Amtrak announced that it would perform some track maintenance during the summer over a period of one and a half months. Five tracks were closed for repairs as part of the reconstruction work, severely reducing track capacity in a situation media outlets deemed "the summer of hell". Many affected NJ Transit passengers were diverted to take the PATH instead. Some Amtrak trains from the Empire Corridor were routed to Grand Central instead of Penn Station. Regular service resumed on September 5, 2017.

Amtrak made further improvements to Penn Station's trackage in summer 2018. As a result, some Empire Corridor trains were rerouted again to Grand Central. The Lake Shore Limited and Cardinal to Chicago were truncated or rerouted because of this work.

Concourses and entrances

Planning and redevelopment

Resurgence of train ridership in the 21st century has pushed the current Pennsylvania Station structure to capacity, leading to several proposals to renovate or rebuild the station.

In 2013, the Regional Plan Association and the Municipal Art Society formed the Alliance for a New Penn Station. Citing overcrowding and the limited capacity of the current station under Madison Square Garden, the Alliance began to advocate for limiting the extension of Madison Square Garden's operating permit to ten years. On July 24, 2013, the New York City Council voted 47–1 to give the Garden a ten-year operating permit, after which the owners will have to move or seek permission anew.

In May 2013, four architecture firms—SHoP Architects, SOM, H3 Hardy Collaboration Architecture, and Diller Scofidio + Renfro—submitted proposals for a new Penn Station. Proposals included moving Madison Square Garden to the Morgan Postal Facility a few blocks southwest and an extension of the High Line to Penn Station, moving Madison Square Garden to the area south of the James Farley Post Office, and moving the arena to a new pier west of Jacob K. Javits Convention Center, all with the intention of redeveloping Penn Station as a mixed-use development. Madison Square Garden officials rejected the idea of moving the facility, calling the plans "pie-in-the-sky."

In January 2016, New York governor Andrew Cuomo announced that requests for proposals would be solicited for the redevelopment of the station, which would be a public-private partnership called the Empire Station Complex. Investors would be granted commercial rights to the station in exchange for paying building costs.

Empire Station Complex 

In January 2020, Governor Cuomo unveiled a proposed southern annex to Penn Station, part of his vision for the Empire Station Complex. The annex would include eight additional tracks with four platforms and would involve demolishing the entire block bounded by 30th and 31st streets between Seventh and Eighth avenues, directly south of the existing station. This new southern terminal, which would require federal approvals and would cost an estimated $13 billion, has not proceeded.

Stores in the LIRR's East End Concourse closed in 2019 in preparation for construction, and the first piece of the expansion, a new direct entrance from 33rd Street to the LIRR concourse, opened on December 31, 2020. Governor Kathy Hochul and MTA officials dedicated the rebuilt concourse on September 6, 2022, even though the project was still incomplete at the time. 33rd Street between Seventh and Eighth Avenues will be permanently closed to vehicular traffic and converted into a pedestrian plaza.

In April 2021, MTA officials proposed two options to reconstruct the Penn Station building under Madison Square Garden, following a year of consultations with NJ Transit, Amtrak, FXCollaborative architects, and WSP USA engineers. One alternative would retain the existing two-level passenger concourse, but remove a portion of the upper concourse to create more open space and a balcony; the other alternative envisions a taller single-level concourse with a multi-story glass atrium in the former taxiway, connecting two new entrances on 31st and 33rd streets. Both plans would improve passenger circulation and access to the platform level, and could demolish the Hulu Theater for a new Eighth Avenue entrance.

In November 2021, after Cuomo resigned, governor Kathy Hochul announced plans to hasten the reconstruction element to take place before construction of the southern annex, and to slightly reduce the size of the development above Penn Station. Hochul's plan selected the one-level concourse alternative and a direct passageway to the Herald Square Station and with the PATH to the 33rd Station. In June 2022, Hochul and New Jersey governor Phil Murphy requested that architects and engineers submit preliminary designs for the station's renovation by the end of the following month. Some of the project's opponents alleged that the plans would disproportionately benefit real-estate firm Vornado Realty Trust, which would redevelop several buildings in the surrounding neighborhood without paying property taxes. John McAslan was hired to design the renovated station that September.

Gateway Program

The Gateway Program is a proposed expansion and renovation of the Northeast Corridor between Newark, New Jersey, and New York City to alleviate the bottleneck under the Hudson River and allow for refurbishment of the existing North River Tunnels. If constructed, two new tunnels would add 25 cross-Hudson train slots during rush hours and connect to a 7-track, 4-platform terminal annex to Penn Station to its south. Some previously planned improvements already underway have also been incorporated into the Gateway plan.

The Gateway Program was unveiled in 2011, one year after the cancellation of the somewhat-similar Access to the Region's Core (ARC) project, and was originally projected to cost $14.5 billion and take 14 years to build. Construction of a "tunnel box" that would preserve the right-of-way on Manhattan's West Side began in September 2013, using $185 million in recovery and resilience funding awarded after Hurricane Sandy in 2012. In 2015, Amtrak said that damage done to the existing trans-Hudson tunnels by Hurricane Sandy had made their replacement urgent. That year, Amtrak reported that environmental and design work was underway, estimated the project's total cost at $20 billion, and said construction would last four to five years.

A draft environmental impact statement was released in July 2017, but the Trump administration delayed consideration of it. Unblocking the project was a stated priority of the Biden administration which took office in January 2021, and the project was approved in May 2021. Federal funding was anticipated to be provided by the Biden administration's Bipartisan Infrastructure Bill, which was passed into law in November 2021, and the first federal funding was announced by Biden in January 2023; the states of New York and New Jersey announced a deal in July 2022 to split the 
other half of costs, with construction on the tunnels to begin sometime in 2023.

See also

 Pennsylvania Tunnel and Terminal Railroad
 Transportation in New York City

Notes

References

Bibliography

 
  Includes track diagram.

External links

 Penn Station – LIRR
 Penn Station – NJ Transit 

1968 establishments in New York City
New York
Beaux-Arts architecture in New York City
Eighth Avenue (Manhattan)
Former Pennsylvania Railroad stations
Hudson Yards, Manhattan
Long Island Rail Road stations in New York City
McKim, Mead & White buildings
New York Tunnel Extension
New York
Station
Railroad terminals in New York City
Railway stations in Manhattan
Railway stations in the United States opened in 1910
Railway stations in the United States opened in 1968
Railway stations located underground in New York (state)
Skidmore, Owings & Merrill buildings
New York
Transit centers in New York City
Transit hubs serving New Jersey
Union stations in the United States